Spilosoma immaculata is a moth in the family Erebidae. It was described by Max Bartel in 1903. It is found in Cameroon, the Democratic Republic of the Congo, Ivory Coast, Nigeria, Sierra Leone and South Africa.

Subspecies
Spilosoma immaculata immaculata
Spilosoma immaculata nyangweensis (Strand, 1922) (Democratic Republic of the Congo)

References

Moths described in 1903
immaculata